Cherrie Ann Mahan (August 14, 1976 – disappeared February 22, 1985; declared legally dead November 5, 1998) was an eight-year-old American girl who disappeared on February 22, 1985, after disembarking a school bus approximately fifty feet from the base of the driveway to her home in rural Winfield Township, Butler County, Pennsylvania. She was declared legally dead in November 1998. Mahan's abduction is strongly believed not to have been committed by a family member.

Mahan's disappearance is one of the most infamous unsolved missing child cases in the United States. The National Center for Missing and Exploited Children featured Mahan as the first missing child to be depicted upon postcards distributed nationwide alongside a headline reading, "Have You Seen Me?" Efforts to locate Mahan, alive or deceased, are ongoing.

Background
Cherrie Ann Mahan was born in Saxonburg, Pennsylvania, on August 14, 1976. Her mother, Janice Mahan, was just 16 at the time she gave birth to her daughter, which she later confessed had been a result of her being raped at age 15. Nonetheless, Janice doted on her daughter, who grew into a friendly, talkative child, later stating: "We were always together. We grew up together. She was my life". Janice later married a Vietnam veteran named LeRoy McKinney, who willingly accepted Mahan as his stepdaughter. In late 1984, the family relocated to Cornplanter Road in Butler County. Mahan attended Winfield Elementary School, where she was regarded as a bright, popular and happy child. 

On Friday, February 22, 1985, the child was excited as her mother intended to take her on a play date when she returned from school. Mahan accompanied her mother to the bus stop located approximately fifty feet from the base of the uphill driveway to their home. When the school bus arrived, the two told each other they loved each other before Mahan boarded the bus.

Disappearance
Mahan was last seen exiting her school bus on Cornplanter Road on February 22, 1985. She alighted this bus with three friends at approximately 4:10 p.m. before her friends entered a car driven by the mother of one of the girls, Debbie Burk, who had followed the school bus in her own car. Mahan was then observed to walk past a bluish-green van which had parked near the bus stop and turn a corner to walk the approximately 150-yard uphill driveway to her home. The van would later be described as a 1970s-era Dodge (possibly a 1976 model) with a distinctive mural depicting a skier traversing a snowcapped mountain painted on the side. Burk was the last individual to see Mahan.

At the time of her disappearance, Mahan was eight years old. Mahan was wearing a gray coat, a blue denim skirt, a white leotard, blue leg warmers, beige boots, and Cabbage Patch earmuffs.

Mahan's stepfather, LeRoy McKinney, overheard the school bus slowing to a halt near his home. He later recollected he had intended to walk down the 150-yard driveway to meet his stepdaughter before his wife said: "No, it's a nice day. Let her walk." When ten minutes had elapsed and Mahan had not arrived, her mother and stepfather began to worry. A search of their driveway did not locate the child or any of her footprints upon the snow on the ground leading to her house, although they did discover a set of tire impressions in the driveway soil approximately fifty yards from their home.

Investigation
Police immediately launched an intense search to locate Mahan. The terrain around her home was extensively searched with the assistance of bloodhounds and helicopters, and investigators conducted house to house inquiries. A thorough search of Butler County was bolstered by an estimated 250 local volunteers, although these searches failed to locate the child. Mahan's local community raised $39,000 as a reward for Mahan's safe return, with a local business also pledging an additional $10,000 for information leading to an arrest and conviction of her abductor or abductors.

Investigators quickly discounted any possibility Mahan had been kidnapped for a ransom; concluding the child most likely knew her abductor or abductors, although all family members were quickly eliminated as suspects.

Suspect vehicle
Appeals as to sightings of the distinctive bluish-green Dodge van produced eyewitnesses who informed investigators they had seen a vehicle matching this description in New Kensington, traveling in the direction of Mount Pleasant. Other witnesses stated they had seen a blue car following this van, and that the van was repainted black one or two weeks after Mahan's disappearance.

When no significant leads developed and the child had been missing for three months, a national direct mailing company printed a photograph of Mahan on postcards accompanied by the question, "Have you seen me?" These cards were mailed to thousands of households across the U.S., placed inside telephone and utility bills, alongside an artist's rendition of the distinctive van seen in the vicinity of her abduction.

Ongoing investigation
In the decades since Mahan's disappearance, investigators have pursued thousands of leads pertaining to the child's whereabouts and the identity of her abductor or abductors. Most of these leads have been potential sightings of Mahan or the two vehicles observed in the vicinity of her abduction, although the child has never been found, and neither vehicle was ever located. Lacking any conclusive evidence to the contrary, investigators have not discounted the possibility Mahan may still be alive.

Pennsylvania State Police continue to receive tips and updates relating to Mahan's disappearance. In 2000, a computer-generated rendition of how Mahan may have looked at age 23 was mailed to thousands of households across America. This line of inquiry failed to generate any significant leads.

In January 2011, Pennsylvania police received a new tip they deemed as "potentially crucial to the investigation in the future". Although investigators declined to release specific details as to this line of inquiry beyond stating the information sourced from an individual known to the child who had provided information with the potential to lead police to "a known specific actor or actors", a spokesman stated the information received had been "more specific" than any information investigators had received in many years. This spokesman declined to further elaborate, citing the ongoing investigation. However, investigators did state this "potentially crucial" information indicates Mahan is unlikely to still be alive.

A further line of inquiry investigators pursued dates from 2014, when investigators pursued a tip that Mahan was alive and living under an assumed name in Michigan. The individual named in this letter was a woman who had been adopted as a child and was unsure of her precise origins, although DNA testing later confirmed this woman was not Mahan.

One of the most recent lines of inquiry investigators pursued dates from 2018, when McKinney received an anonymous handwritten letter describing in detail who had murdered her daughter, why they had done so, and where her remains are buried. The author of this letter concluded this correspondence by stating: "I pray you find some peace after you find her body."

Legal declaration
Although existing laws had determined Cherrie Mahan could have been declared legally dead seven years after her disappearance, Mahan's mother only petitioned to have her daughter legally declared deceased in 1998. A Butler County judge approved a petition from Janice McKinney to do so in November that year. Three months earlier, she had donated the $50,000 reward sum for information leading to the safe return of her daughter to the National Center for Missing and Exploited Children. Cherrie Mahan's trust fund was given to her younger brother, Robert, who was born four years after Mahan's disappearance.

Addressing the media following the conclusion of these legal proceedings, Janice McKinney stated: "When people die, you have a body. You kiss [them upon] the face, you put them in the ground, and you say goodbye ... that's something I never had. This is not over. We'll always look for Cherrie. If nothing else, she'll always be [alive] in our hearts."

Mother's theory
Mahan's mother, Janice McKinney, has stated her conviction her daughter's disappearance can still be solved. In 2020, McKinney revealed her conviction that although she does not believe Cherrie's biological father was involved in her abduction, she believes individuals known to him were. Mahan's mother has stated that prior to her daughter's disappearance, nobody had believed her claims that her daughter had been conceived through her being raped, adding that on "any other day", she would have been standing at the bottom of her driveway to meet her daughter when the school bus arrived, and that February 22, 1985, was the first day she had not done so.

Aftermath
In 2019, Mahan's mother discussed her ongoing turmoil as to the lack of knowledge of her daughter's fate. Emphasizing her belief that an anonymous tip from the public could finally give herself and her family the closure they crave, McKinney stated to the media: "I just wish someone would come forth and tell me what happened. That's all I pray for, all the time, is just to know."

Cherrie Mahan's family and friends hold an annual remembrance dinner at a restaurant in East Butler on a date close to each anniversary of her disappearance. At this event, stories and memories of Cherrie are shared. Four of the attendees of this annual dinner are close friends of Mahan, who have each publicly stated the disappearance of their friend has had a profound impact on their lives, and that becoming mothers themselves has increased their empathy for Janice McKinney's sense of loss.

See also

 Child abduction
 Cold case
 Crime in Pennsylvania
 List of people who disappeared
 National Center for Missing and Exploited Children
 The Doe Network

Notes

References

Cited works and further reading

External links
 2005 news article detailing the twentieth anniversary of Mahan's abduction
 2018 news article detailing the efforts of Mahan's family to locate their relative
 Cbslocal.com webpage pertaining to the disappearance of Cherrie Mahan
 National Center for Missing and Exploited Children case file pertaining to Cherrie Mahan
 charleyproject.org webpage pertaining to Cherrie Mahan
 doenetwork.org webpage pertaining to Cherrie Mahan

1976 births
1980s missing person cases
1985 in Pennsylvania
Butler County, Pennsylvania
Crimes against children
Missing American children
Missing person cases in Pennsylvania
People declared dead in absentia